Skarsfjord is a Norwegian surname. Notable people with the surname include:

Rune Skarsfjord (born 1970), Norwegian football manager
Terje Skarsfjord (1942–2018), Norwegian footballer and manager

Norwegian-language surnames